Bumblefuck, USA is a 2011 film containing both dramatic and documentary elements about lesbian and gay life experienced by a Dutch woman arriving in the United States heartland.  The movie was featured on Autostraddle as one of "8 Pretty Great Lesbian Movies You Haven’t Seen Yet".

Accolades 
 Frameline 35 - official selection
 Outfest 2011 - official selection

References

External links 
 

2011 LGBT-related films
Lesbian-related films
2011 films
2010s English-language films